Serge Huo-Chao-Si (born 1968 in La Réunion) is a contemporary artist and comic book creator.

Early life
Serge Huo-Chao-Si studied in Saint-Denis, Réunion and in Lille, and graduated in mechanical engineering from high school on his native island.

Huo-Chao-Si was among the founders of Le Cri du Margouillat magazine, where he was one of the most active authors. As well as comics, he is also interested in contemporary art, painting, drawing, photography, with many exhibitions of his work have been shown in Réunion and metropolitan France.

Bibliography

Illustrations
 Votez Ubu colonial, text by Emmanuel Genvrin, éd. Grand Océan 1994

Comics
With Appollo
 La Grippe coloniale, t1 : Le retour d'Ulysse, éd. Vents d'Ouest 2003 
 Dans les Hauts (collection), éd. Centre du monde 2001 
 Cases en tôle, éd. Centre du Monde 1999 
 La Guerre d'Izidine, Académie de la Réunion/Union européenne, collection "Floraisons", 2006

Awards
La Grippe coloniale won the Prix de la critique from the Association des Critiques et des journalistes de Bande Dessinée in 2003.

Notes

References

Serge Huo-Chao-Si at Lambiek's Comiclopedia
Serge Huo-Chao-Si at Bedetheque

External links
Histoire de la Bande Dessinée à La Réunion, BD Zoom, December 26, 2008 

People from Réunion
People of Chinese descent from Réunion
Living people
1968 births